Eugene H. Hahn (born July 21, 1929) is a Wisconsin politician.

Hahn was born in Milwaukee, but was raised in the Town of Springvale, near Cambria, Wisconsin. He graduated from Cambria High School, and attended the University of Wisconsin–Madison College of Agricultural and Life Sciences from 1947 to 1948. He married Lorraine Eleanor Closs (1931–2021) in 1949. He worked as a farmer for most of his life.

Hahn first became involved in politics in 1957, when he was elected assessor for the Town of Springvale. He served as assessor until 1961. In 1972, Hahn was elected to the Board of Supervisors for Columbia County, where he served until 1991. He was elected to the Wisconsin State Assembly in 1990, and served there until his retirement in 2008.

References

County supervisors in Wisconsin
Living people
University of Wisconsin–Madison College of Agricultural and Life Sciences alumni
1929 births
Politicians from Milwaukee
People from Columbia County, Wisconsin
21st-century American politicians
Republican Party members of the Wisconsin State Assembly